Hot Rap Songs (formerly known as Hot Rap Tracks and Hot Rap Singles) is a chart released weekly by Billboard in the United States. It lists the 25 most popular hip-hop/rap songs, calculated weekly by airplay on rhythmic and urban radio stations and sales in hip hop-focused or exclusive markets. Streaming data and digital downloads were added to the methodology of determining chart rankings in 2012. From 1989 through 2001, it was based on how much the single sold in that given week.  The song with the most weeks at number one is "Old Town Road", with a total of 20 weeks.

Chart statistics and other facts

Artists with the most number-one singles

Note: Rihanna is a featured artist on all her number-one singles.

Artists with the most consecutive weeks at number one
25 weeks – Lil Wayne ("Lollipop", "A Milli")
20 weeks – Drake ("I'm On One", "Headlines"); T-Pain ("Good Life", "Low"); T.I. ("Whatever You Like", "Live Your Life")
19 weeks – 50 Cent ("Candy Shop", "Hate It Or Love It", "Just A Lil Bit"); Lil Nas X (“Old Town Road”)

Note: Above chart only considers songs that charted in 2004 or later

Artists simultaneously occupying the top three positions
 50 Cent: April 2, 2005
"Candy Shop" (featuring Olivia) (No. 1 April 2, 2005)
"Hate It or Love It" (with The Game) (No. 2 April 2, 2005)
"How We Do" (with The Game) (No. 3 April 2, 2005)
 Drake: October 8, 2011 through October 22, 2011
"I'm On One" (with DJ Khaled, Rick Ross & Lil Wayne) (No. 1 October 8, No. 2 October 15, and No. 3 October 22, 2011)
"Headlines" (No. 2 October 8 and No. 1 October 15, and October 22, 2011)
"She Will" (with Lil Wayne) (No. 3 October 8 and October 15, and No. 2 October 22, 2011)

Songs with the most weeks at number one

Self-replacement at number one

Lead artist
 Bow Wow — "Let Me Hold You" (Bow Wow feat. Omarion) (7 weeks) → "Like You" (Bow Wow feat. Ciara) (4 weeks) (September 10, 2005)
 Lil Wayne — "Lollipop" (Lil Wayne feat. Static Major) (18 weeks) → "A Milli" (7 weeks) (July 26, 2008)
 T.I. — "Whatever You Like" (10 weeks) → "Live Your Life" (T.I. feat. Rihanna) (10 weeks) (November 29, 2008)
 Drake —  "Make Me Proud" (Drake feat. Nicki Minaj) (1 week) → "The Motto" (Drake feat. Lil Wayne) (14 weeks) (February 18, 2012)
 Macklemore & Ryan Lewis — "Thrift Shop" (Macklemore & Ryan Lewis feat. Wanz) (15 weeks) → "Can't Hold Us" (Macklemore & Ryan Lewis feat. Ray Dalton) (14 weeks) (May 4, 2013)
Drake — "God's Plan" (11 weeks) → "Nice For What" (8 weeks) (April 21, 2018)
Drake — "Nice For What" (8 weeks) → "In My Feelings" (11 weeks) (July 21, 2018)
Post Malone — "Sunflower (Spider-Man: Into The Spider-Verse)" (Post Malone & Swae Lee) (11 weeks) → "Wow." (1 week) (April 6, 2019)

Featured artist
 T-Pain — "Good Life" (Kanye West feat. T-Pain) (9 weeks) (November 3, 2007) → "Low" (Flo Rida feat. T-Pain) (11 weeks) (January 5, 2008)
 Kanye West — "Run This Town" (Jay-Z feat. Rihanna & Kanye West) (7 weeks) → "Forever" (Drake feat. Kanye West, Lil Wayne, & Eminem) (1 week) (November 14, 2009)

Combined (lead and featured artist)
 50 Cent — "Candy Shop" (50 Cent feat. Olivia) (6 weeks) → "Hate It or Love It" (The Game feat. 50 Cent) (4 weeks) (April 23, 2005) → "Just a Lil Bit" (50 Cent) (9 weeks) (May 21, 2005)
 Drake — "Fancy" (Drake feat. T.I. & Swizz Beatz) (1 week) → "Right Above It" (Lil Wayne feat. Drake) (5 weeks) (November 6, 2010)
 Chris Brown — "Look at Me Now" (Chris Brown feat. Lil Wayne & Busta Rhymes) (10 weeks) → "My Last" (Big Sean feat. Chris Brown) (2 weeks) (July 2, 2011)
 2 Chainz — "Mercy" (Kanye West feat. Big Sean, Pusha T & 2 Chainz) (9 weeks) → "No Lie" (2 Chainz feat. Drake) (6 weeks) (September 8, 2012)
Travis Scott — "Zeze" (Kodak Black feat. Travis Scott & Offset) (1 week) → "SICKO MODE" (Travis Scott) (10 weeks) (November 3, 2018)

Total weeks at number one per decade

2000s
Total number weeks at number one as a lead or featured artist
 Missy Elliott – 56 weeks
 T.I – 49 weeks
 Bow Wow – 40 weeks 
 Kanye West – 32 weeks
 T-Pain – 29 weeks
 Ludacris – 29 weeks
 Lil Wayne – 28 weeks
 Nelly – 25 weeks
 Snoop Dogg – 20 weeks

2010s
Total number weeks at number one as a lead or featured artist
 Youngboy Never Broke Again – 223 weeks
 Drake – 125 weeks
 Lil Wayne – 53 weeks
 Macklemore & Ryan Lewis – 29 weeks
 Post Malone – 28 weeks
 Jay-Z – 25 weeks
 Iggy Azalea – 24 weeks
 Pitbull – 21 weeks
 Rihanna – 20 weeks
 Kanye West, Lil Nas X – 19 weeks
 Eminem, Charli XCX – 18 weeks
 Nicki Minaj – 18 weeks

See also
 List of number-one rap singles of 2018 (U.S.)
 Hot R&B/Hip-Hop Songs
 Billboard charts

References

Billboard charts
American hip hop